Astartea pulchella is a shrub endemic to Western Australia.

The shrub is found along the south coast in the South West
and Great Southern regions of Western Australia.

References

Eudicots of Western Australia
pulchella
Endemic flora of Western Australia
Plants described in 1828
Taxa named by Barbara Lynette Rye